Circle Of Three is a series of young adult paperback novels by Michael Thomas Ford under the pseudonym Isobel Bird.  It follows the lives of three teenage girls from different social cliques, who come together over a mutual interest in witchcraft. It was published between February 5, 2001 and March 19, 2002.

About the Series
Kate Morgan, a preppy, popular basketball player, checks out a book of spells while doing research for her history paper on medieval witch trials. She casts a love spell, which leads to disaster.  She seeks the help of two girls who had previously checked out the spellbook, Annie Crandall, an intellectual, and Cooper Rivers, an alternative outsider.  After putting things to rights, the three decide to continue studying Wicca together, which they do at a local New Age store called Crones' Circle.  Each of them face various conflicts on her path, both external and internal.  Kate is torn between fitting in and embracing the Wiccan path; Annie tries to reconcile her scientific, rational thinking with her new-found intuitive, emotional faith, as well as coming to terms with her parents' deaths years before; the headstrong and independent Cooper has trouble adjusting to both the unpredictability of magic and the novelty of intense friendship.

The series takes place over a period of roughly one year and two months, during which Kate, Annie, and Cooper undergo the traditional year-and-a-day of Wiccan study before being initiated into a coven.

Isobel Bird wrote the series to do what many non-fiction books about Wicca fail to do: show how Wiccans experience their religion.  Thus, the books cover a wide range of topics related to Wiccan life beyond outright practice, including conflicts with mainstream society, the diversity of the Neo-Pagan community, and legal rights.

Originally released in mass market paperback, the series is currently out of print, though the books are still available used and as eBooks.  The eBooks feature bonus material, such as interviews with Isobel Bird, crafts, and magical exercises.  Chapter excerpts are available on the HarperCollins website.

The first nine books are available in Germany and France, where the series is known as Magic Circle.  It is published in German by Schneiderbuch. The first four books have been published in Castilian Spanish under the series name El Círculo de Fuego, by Editorial Diagonal (Grup 62).  The first six books have been published in Italian as Il Cerchio delle Streghe by Gruppo Editorale Armenia.

In 2005, Michael Thomas Ford revealed that he had written the Circle of Three series, using the pen name, Isobel Bird.  He also wrote a short story titled "Ever After" for the YA horror anthology 666: The Number of the Beast under that name.

Main characters

Kate Morgan

At the beginning of the series Kate Morgan is a 15-year-old sophomore who enjoys her time on the girls' basketball team and crushing over the most popular boy in school; Scott Coogan.  In the pilot novel she is friends with fellow basketball teammates Tara Redding, Jessica Talbot and the self-involved ringleader, Sherrie Adams who is known for spreading gossip and rumors whether they be true or false.  But as the series progresses she becomes friends with Annie Crandall, Cooper Rivers and later, a runaway teen Sasha, who is introduced in the 2nd book Merry Meet.

Throughout the series Kate is living with her parents Mr. Morgan; who owns and works at a sporting goods store and Mrs. Morgan, who works at a catering company, while her elder brother Kyle is away at college.  Kate's relationships with her mother and father are relatively normal and good natured, but when she "comes out of the broom closet" everything changes when they force her to see a psychiatrist and ground her from seeing her friends.  However, after Kate convinces them to perform a healing ritual on their ill Aunt Annette "Netty", and slowly gets them to know her Wiccan teachers Sophia and Archer, their relationship begins to mend and gets back on good graces.

In the first novel, Kate playfully performs a love spell that enchants her crush, senior Scott Coogan, into noticing her and eventually falling in love with her. The spell, although seemingly innocent enough, backfires due to its selfish connotations and causes a series of incidents which ultimately causes Kate to seek the help of Annie Crandall and later Cooper Rivers, two socially awkward teenage girls in her grade who also checked out the same book of spells which tempted Kate into the whole debacle. The girls form an unlikely alliance and bond that initially solves the problem of the backfired spell, and later, when they choose to study witchcraft at a local bookstore, "Crone's Circle", which caters to Paganism, leads them down a path of discovery, betrayal, fear, and ultimately renewed faith in themselves as young women. For Kate especially, her journey in the series leads her down a path that challenges her beliefs and the conventional norms her family has set in place for her. Shifting from a relationship with normal guy Scott to fellow Wiccan Tyler, who is the son of one of her teachers, Kate learns how connecting with Wicca and learning how to be truthful to herself and those important in her life, ultimately will help her be a better person.

Throughout the series Kate faces a number of trials, such as telling her parents and brother the truth about her study of wicca, dabbling in the sacred art of Santeria, dealing with the illness of her favorite aunt, balancing her old friends and new friends in her life, and the effect witchcraft has on it all.

Books
The first four books are told from the point of view of only one girl each. Kate is the center of So Mote It Be and Merry Meet; Cooper is the center of Second Sight; Annie is the center of What the Cards Said.  However, starting with Book 5: In the Dreaming, the point of view switches among the three girls, alternating chapters, for the rest of the series.

Book 1: So Mote It Be

With this ribbon I do bind
my heart to yours and yours to mine.
Love, I call you, come to me,
As is my will, so mote it be.

When 15-year-old Kate Morgan decides to cast a love spell, the end results are catastrophic, and she cannot stop it by herself.  But the book of spells she checked out from the school library tells her of two strangers who can help her-but only if she can find them.

Book 2: Merry Meet

Joined together, hand in hand, our circle gathers round, 
to work our magic, weave the web, and dance on sacred ground.  
By the Goddess we are called, witch to witch and friend to friend, 
to merry meet, and merry part and merry meet again.

A book of spells brought three unlikely friends; Kate, Annie and Cooper together.  Now the three of them are compelled to learn more, and the door is opened with the stirring ritual of the Vernal Equinox.

Book 3: Second Sight

Show me places cloaked in secrets,
pierce the gloom of darkest night.
Reveal the one that which has been hidden,
Let her see with second sight.
Let only the one have the third eye

Kate, Annie, and Cooper are Wiccans-joined by magic bound to nature. Their dreams have turned to visions of a missing girl, calling to them for help....

Book 4: What the Cards Said

Cards of fortune, tell your story,
Answer all I've come to ask.
Let the draw set forth the course
of what has been and yet may pass.

When Annie discovers the ancient cards of Tarot, her fascination with them spirals beyond her control, when her readings become reality.  As if cursed, Annie faces her two friends Kate and Cooper with this new-found power-a power that threatens the very strength of their Wiccan bond.

Book 5: In the Dreaming

On the eve of fair midsummer,
Longest day and shortest night,
Faerie magic, fill these woods
with joyous song and laughter bright.

On the eve of Midsummer; one of the most magical nights of the year, finds Kate, Annie, and Cooper celebrating the most joyous sabbat with nature-and a few not unwelcome strangers.  On a night when identities and emotions become tangled and confused under the strange solstice sky, one will be led astray.

Book 6: Ring of Light

Here within the healing circle,
Bathe in light and pain dispel.
All that sickens, all that troubles,
wash away and be made well.

Disillusioned from her time during the Midsummer festivities, Cooper abandons the Wiccan circle and Kate and Annie are left without her.  But when an illness threatens someone close to one of them, Cooper returns.  But can the circle, once broken, ever be restored?

Book 7: Blue Moon

Ancient moon, o ageless traveler,
sailing on the sea of stars,
As once more you come to fullness,
Turn your shining face to ours.

The second full moon of the month-the blue moon-is a time when powers are heightened, with unpredictable results.  However, when Annie attempts the channeling practice called aspecting, she changes into someone Kate and Cooper hardly recognize.  Can their combined strength restore Annie's spirit?

Book 8: The Five Paths

North and South and East and West,
Earth and Fire, Air and Water,
And the fifth path, center's spirit,
on it walk the searching daughters.

The five-pointed star is the Wiccan symbol of the spirit, and that's how Cooper wears it.  Those not versed in the ways of the Craft find it unsettling, however.  Will Cooper, Annie, and Kate be able to withstand the tide of controversy bearing down upon them or will their circle break apart forever?

Book 9: Through the Veil

As the year comes to an ending,
In the hour 'tween old and new,
part the veil and let pass
the spirits who would travel through.

As Annie, Kate, and Cooper prepare for Samhain, they are filled with anticipation.  It is a time when the veil between the worlds is thin, and those who have passed into spirit world may be more easily contacted.  Those Annie hold dear dwell behind this veil already-will she find them on this eve of Wiccan celebration?

Book 10: Making the Saint

In the circle ringed with fire,
stand and meet your chosen one.
Dance among the laughing spirits,
and listen as their song is sung.

A mysterious stranger shows Kate, Annie and Cooper how to connect with the spirit world, but there are alarming effects, especially for Kate.  Stepping outside the bounds of Wicca, Kate becomes entranced—so much so her friends fear for her.

Book 11: The House of Winter

Winter's cold and Winter's darkness,
wraps us in these frozen hours. 
As the ceaseless wheel turns we call,
the sun to warm us with its power.

Cooper, Annie, and Kate celebrate the winter solstice in true Wiccan spirit.  The threesome joins the practitioners of the Craft in a remote, haunted house in the wintry mountains.  An unexpected blizzard strikes, and the girls cannot resist the lure of the dark house's shrouded mystery.

Book 12: Written in the Stars

Ever moving, Ever changing,
stars and planets come and go.
Those who watch their movements say,
As is above, so is below.

Astrology—the study of the stars—is said to reveal the truth of the universe.  Cooper, Kate, and Annie find this to be alarmingly true, and their progress on the Wiccan path is nearly undone by what the stars tell them.

Book 13: And It Harm None

"And it harm none, do as ye will,"
so says the ancient wiccan rede.  
Those who do not heed its words will learn
the Power of the Law of Three.

Annie, Kate, and Cooper uncover what looks like a crime.  When they look more closely, it is not.  Knowing the Law of Three—that harm comes back to haunt—can they still help a friend in need without paying for it themselves?

Book 14: The Challenge Box

Reach inside and choose your challenge,
Find the path that you must travel.
What trials have you to over come?
What mysteries shall you unravel?

Of her circle, Kate has always struggled the most in learning the ways of the Craft.  As her Wiccan initiation approaches, a final challenge threatens to overcome her at last.

Book 15: Initiation

Tonight you take the last step on
of your journey of a year and a day.
Welcome home o new-made witch,
And in our circle rest and stay.

The joyful culmination of a year and day's dedication—Kate, Annie and Cooper's Wiccan initiation—brings celebration, an exhilarating ritual, and unexpected choices for the new witches.

See also

Sweep (book series)
Daughters of the Moon
Blue is for Nightmares

References

External links
 HarperCollins page
 Teenreads.com series profile
 The Circle - Fansite with series wiki

2001 American novels
2002 American novels
American young adult novels
Avon (publisher) books
Wiccan books
Witchcraft in written fiction
Works published under a pseudonym
Young adult novel series
2000s in modern paganism